The 2016 Asia-Pacific Rally Championship season is an international rally championship sanctioned by the FIA. The championship will be contested by a combination of regulations with Group N competing directly against Super 2000 cars for points.

The championship will begin in New Zealand on 29 April and conclude in India on 11 December.

Event calendar and results
The 2016 APRC is as follows:

References

External links

APRC Live Podcast
APRC News and Video

Asia-Pacific Rally Championship seasons
Asia-Pacific
Asia-Pacific
Asia-Pacific